Bred 2 Die, Born 2 Live (stylized as Bred 2 Die · Born 2 Live) is the debut studio album by American rapper Lil Scrappy. The album was released on December 5, 2006 by Warner Bros. Records, BME Recordings, Reprise Records and G-Unit Records.  The album debuted at number 24 on the Billboard 200 with about 82,000 copies sold. Guests on the album include Yung Joc, Young Buck, Young Dro, Lil Jon, Three 6 Mafia, Lloyd, Yo Gotti, Olivia, 50 Cent, among others.

Singles 
The album's lead single, "Money in the Bank", featuring Young Buck, was featured in the video game WWE SmackDown vs. Raw 2007, and was released on March 28, 2006. The song, produced by Isaac "Ike Dirty" Hayes, peaked at number twenty-eight on the Billboard Hot 100 and was certified Gold by the RIAA for sales of over 500,000. The second single is "Gangsta, Gangsta", featuring vocals and production by Lil Jon. The third single is "Oh Yeah (Work)", featuring E-40 and Sean P of the YoungBloodZ.

Track listing 

Sample credits
 "Livin' in the Projects" contains a sample from "Smile", performed by Scarface and 2Pac.

Charts

Weekly charts

Year-end charts

References 

2006 debut albums
Lil Scrappy albums
Warner Records albums
Reprise Records albums
Albums produced by Bangladesh (record producer)
Albums produced by Jake One
Albums produced by Jazze Pha
Albums produced by J. R. Rotem
Albums produced by Lil Jon
Albums produced by Eminem
Albums produced by Drumma Boy
Albums produced by Don Cannon